But It's Nothing Serious (Italian: Ma non è una cosa seria) is a 1936 Italian "white-telephones" romantic comedy film directed by Mario Camerini and starring Vittorio De Sica, Elisa Cegani and Assia Noris. It is based on a play by Luigi Pirandello. Two years later Camerini remade it as a German film The Man Who Couldn't Say No.

The film's sets were designed by the art director Gastone Medin. It was shot at the studios of Caesar Film in Rome.

Cast 
 Vittorio De Sica as Memmo Speranza
 Elisa Cegani as Gasperina
 Umberto Melnati as Vico Lamanna
 Assia Noris as Loletta Festa
 Elsa De Giorgi as Elsa
 Ugo Ceseri as Barranco
 Vivi Gioi as Matilde
 Giuseppe Pierozzi as Un pensionnaire
 Maria Arcione
 Celeste Calza
 Jole Capodaglio
 Antonio Centa
 Mario Ferrari
 Giuliana Gianni
 Zoe Incrocci
 Carola Lotti
 Dina Romano
 Lia Rosa
 Nietta Zocchi

See also
But It Isn't Serious (1921)

References

Bibliography 
  Bert Cardullo. Screening the Stage: Studies in Cinedramatic Art. Peter Lang, 2006.

External links 
 

1936 films
Italian romantic comedy films
1936 romantic comedy films
1930s Italian-language films
Films directed by Mario Camerini
Films based on works by Luigi Pirandello
Italian films based on plays
Italian black-and-white films
Sound film remakes of silent films
1930s Italian films